The 1965 Australian Formula 2 Championship was a CAMS sanctioned motor racing title open to Racing Cars complying with Australian Formula 2. The championship was contested over a single, 34 lap, 76.5 mile (123 km) race at the Warwick Farm circuit in New South Wales, Australia on 19 September 1965. It was the second Australian Formula 2 Championship to be awarded.

The championship was won by Greg Cusack, driving a Repco Brabham Cosworth.

Results

Notes
 Pole position: Greg Cusack, 1m 42.3s
 Starters: 15
 Finishers: 10
 Fastest lap: Greg Cusack, 1m 41.2s, 80.04 mph, new Formula 2 lap record

References

External links
 Australian Titles, docs.cams.com.au, as archived at www.webcitation.org on 16 July 2014
 Images at www.autopics.com.au

Australian Formula 2 Championship
Formula 2 Championship
Motorsport at Warwick Farm